Abuzaydabadi is a dialect of Soi and the language of people in Abuzaydabad, a city in central Iran. The language is called [Abuzaydabadi] by Persians, and it is called Bizovoy or Bizovoyja in Abuzaydabadi language itself.

References

Languages of Iran